Christopher Keon Johnson is an American professional basketball player for the Portland Trail Blazers of the National Basketball Association (NBA). He played college basketball for the Tennessee Volunteers.

Early life and high school career
Two months before beginning high school, Johnson suffered open fractures in four of his fingers, was thrown about 10 feet and lost consciousness in a fireworks accident. He underwent surgery to repair blood vessels in his hand and avoid amputation, and he underwent eight weeks of intensive physical therapy.

Johnson played high school basketball for The Webb School in Bell Buckle, Tennessee. In his sophomore season, he averaged 25.6 points, 10.2 rebounds, and 4.1 assists per game, earning Division II-A Tennessee Mr. Basketball honors. As a junior, Johnson averaged 25.3 points, 9.4 rebounds and 3.7 assists per game, leading his team to the Division II-A state semifinals. He repeated as Division II-A Tennessee Mr. Basketball. Early in his senior season, Johnson suffered a season-ending meniscus injury. In four games, he averaged 30.5 points with 10.5 rebounds and 5.8 assists per game.

Recruiting
On August 6, 2019, Johnson committed to play college basketball for Tennessee over offers from Ohio State and Virginia, among others. By the end of his high school career, Johnson was rated by major recruiting services as a consensus five-star recruit and the highest ranked player in Tennessee in the 2020 class. He became the first top-ranked in-state prospect to commit to Tennessee since Robert Hubbs III in 2013.

College career
On February 6, 2021, Johnson scored a career-high 27 points in an 82–71 win over Kentucky. As a freshman, he averaged 11.3 points, 3.5 rebounds and 2.5 assists per game, and was named to the Southeastern Conference (SEC) All-Freshman Team. On April 7, 2021, Johnson declared for the 2021 NBA draft, forgoing his college eligibility. At the NBA Draft Combine, he recorded the highest maximum vertical leap in combine history, at 48 inches.

Professional career
Johnson was selected with the 21st pick in the 2021 NBA draft by the New York Knicks and was traded to the Los Angeles Clippers. On August 6, 2021, he signed his rookie scale contract with the Clippers. In his rookie year, Johnson played in only 15 games for the Clippers.

On February 4, 2022, Johnson was traded, alongside Eric Bledsoe, Justise Winslow, and a 2025 second-round pick, to the Portland Trail Blazers in exchange for Norman Powell and Robert Covington. Johnson made his Trail Blazers debut on February 24, recording four points and four rebounds in a 132–95 loss to the Golden State Warriors. On April 1, he scored a career-high 20 points, alongside three assists, in a 130–111 loss to the San Antonio Spurs. The Trail Blazers ultimately finished the season with a 27–55 record and did not qualify for the playoffs for the first time since 2013.

Johnson played for the Trail Blazers during the 2022 NBA Summer League. He averaged 14.2 points per game en route to the team's second Las Vegas Summer League championship in franchise history.

Career statistics

NBA

|-
| style="text-align:left;"| 
| style="text-align:left;"| L.A. Clippers
| 15 || 0 || 9.0 || .333 || .273 || .762 || 1.4 || .9 || .5 || .1 || 3.5
|-
| style="text-align:left;"| 
| style="text-align:left;"| Portland
| 22 || 12 || 25.5 || .357 || .348 || .833 || 2.7 || 2.9 || 1.0 || .5 || 9.7
|- class="sortbottom"
| style="text-align:center;" colspan="2"| Career
| 37 || 12 || 18.8 || .353 || .340 || .804 || 2.2 || 2.1 || .8 || .3 || 7.2

College

|-
| style="text-align:left;"| 2020–21
| style="text-align:left;"| Tennessee
| 27 || 17 || 25.5 || .449 || .271 || .703 || 3.5 || 2.5 || 1.1 || .4 || 11.3

Personal life
Johnson's mother, Conswella Sparrow Johnson, was a two-time Class AAA Tennessee Miss Basketball winner in high school and played college basketball for Auburn, where she was a two-time All-Southeastern Conference selection.

References

External links
Tennessee Volunteers bio
USA Basketball bio

2002 births
Living people
Agua Caliente Clippers players
American men's basketball players
Basketball players from Tennessee
Los Angeles Clippers players
New York Knicks draft picks
People from Shelbyville, Tennessee
Portland Trail Blazers players
Shooting guards
Tennessee Volunteers basketball players